Ohio Township is one of ten townships in Warrick County, Indiana, United States. As of the 2010 census, its population was 37,749 and it contained 14,922 housing units. It contains 63% of Warrick County's population. It has the third largest township population in Southwestern Indiana, behind two townships in Vanderburgh County and is one of the fastest-growing townships in Indiana. Ohio Township population grew 21.8% from the 2000 census to the 2010 census. Unlike most townships in Indiana, Ohio Township has two incorporated towns within its jurisdiction, Newburgh and Chandler.

History
Ohio Township was organized in 1826. The township derives its name from the Ohio River, which forms its southern border.

The Angel Mounds, Ellerbusch site, and Roberts-Morton House are listed on the National Register of Historic Places.

Geography

Cities, towns, villages
 Chandler (All but the far east end)
 Newburgh

Unincorporated towns
 Camp Brosend at 
 Hillcrest Terrace at 
 Paradise at 
 Rustic Hills at 
 Stevenson at 
(This list is based on USGS data and may include former settlements.)

Adjacent townships
 Campbell Township (north)
 Boon Township (east)
 Anderson Township (southeast)
 Knight Township, Vanderburgh County (west)

Cemeteries
The township contains these four cemeteries: Casey, Greenwood, Hedge and Rose Hill.

Lakes
 Allens Lake
 Chase Lake
 Pfafflin Lake

School districts
 Warrick County School Corporation

Political districts
 Indiana's 8th congressional district
 State House District 75
 State House District 77
 State House District 78
 State Senate District 50

References
 United States Census Bureau 2007 TIGER/Line Shapefiles
 United States Board on Geographic Names (GNIS)
 IndianaMap

External links
 Indiana Township Association
 United Township Association of Indiana

Townships in Warrick County, Indiana
Townships in Indiana